Route 214 or Highway 214 can refer to:

Canada
 Manitoba Provincial Road 214
 Newfoundland and Labrador Route 214
 Nova Scotia Route 214
 Prince Edward Island Route 214
 Quebec Route 214

China
 China National Highway 214

Costa Rica
 National Route 214

India
 National Highway 214 (India)

Ireland
 R214 road (Ireland)

United States
 Arkansas Highway 214
 California State Route 214 (former)
 Connecticut Route 214
 Florida State Road 214 (former)
 Georgia State Route 214 (former)
 Iowa Highway 214 (former)
 K-214 (Kansas highway)
Kentucky Route 214
 Maine State Route 214
 Maryland Route 214
 M-214 (Michigan highway) (former)
 Montana Secondary Highway 214
 New York State Route 214
 North Carolina Highway 214
 Oregon Route 214
 Pennsylvania Route 214
 Rhode Island Route 214
 South Dakota Highway 214 (former)
 Tennessee State Route 214
 Texas State Highway 214
 Texas State Highway Loop 214
 Texas State Highway Spur 214
 Utah State Route 214 (former)
 Vermont Route 214
 Virginia State Route 214
 West Virginia Route 214
 Wyoming Highway 214